Batu Dam is a dam in Gombak District, Selangor, Malaysia. The dam is a water supply dam. The dam holding capacity is 30,199 ML. The Sungai Batu water treatment plant produces 114 ML per day of treated water.

See also
1998 Klang Valley water crisis

References

Dams in Selangor
Gombak District
Klang River
Water supply and sanitation in Malaysia